Ed Ordynski (born 21 July 1957) is an Australian former rally driver. He served as Chairman of the Australian Rally Commission (ARCom) in 2007.

Ordynski is best known for his exploits driving Mitsubishi cars. Driving a Galant VR-4, he won the Australian Rally Championship in 1990.  He also won the Group N category that year, and went on to win that category three more times (1993, 1994, 1995), driving a Lancer Evolution.

Ordynski won the 1995 Mobil 1 Round Australia Trial driving a Holden Commodore (VR) entered by the Mobil Bridgestone Rally Team. He also drove 5.0 Litre Touring Cars in 1995, recording a tenth place in the 1995 Sandown 500, and a retirement in the 1995 Tooheys 1000 at Bathurst in a Holden Commodore (VP).

Away from rallying and motorsport, Ed Ordynski was a Year 5 Primary school teacher at Mitcham Primary School circa 1985

.

See also
Confederation of Australian Motor Sport (CAMS)

References

Australian rally drivers
World Rally Championship drivers
Supercars Championship drivers
Racing drivers from South Australia
1957 births
Living people